The 2013–14 East Tennessee State Buccaneers basketball team represented East Tennessee State University during the 2013–14 NCAA Division I men's basketball season. The Buccaneers, led by 11th year head coach Murry Bartow, played their home games at the ETSU/Mountain States Health Alliance Athletic Center, with three home games at the Freedom Hall Civic Center, and were members of the Atlantic Sun Conference. They finished the season 19–16, 10–8 in A-Sun play to finish in a three way tie for fourth place. They advanced to the semifinals of the A-Sun tournament where they lost to Florida Gulf Coast. They were invited to the CollegeInsider.com Postseason Tournament where they defeated Chattanooga in the first round before losing in the second round to Towson.

This was their last season as a member of the Atlantic Sun as they will join the Southern Conference in July, 2014.

Roster

Schedule

 
|-
!colspan=9 style="background:#041E42; color:#FFC72C;"| Exhibition
|-

|-
!colspan=9 style="background:#041E42; color:#FFC72C;"| Regular season
|-

|-
!colspan=9 style="background:#041E42; color:#FFC72C;"| Atlantic Sun tournament

|-
!colspan=9 style="background:#041E42; color:#FFC72C;"| CIT

References

East Tennessee State Buccaneers men's basketball seasons
East Tennessee State
East Tennessee State
East Tennessee
East Tennessee